"High" is a song by Australian electronic music duo Peking Duk. The song features vocals from Nicole Millar. It was written and produced by Adam Hyde and Reuben Styles, Nicole Millar & Sam Littlemore. The song was released on 14 February 2014, by Vicious Recordings as the lead single from the duo's debut EP, Songs to Sweat To.

High reached a peak of #13 on the New Zealand charts and #5 on the Australian ARIA Charts, where the song also received a triple platinum certification by the Australian Recording Industry Association

The song placed at #2 on the Triple J Hottest 100, 2014. It was also included in the soundtrack for the football simulation game Pro Evolution Soccer 2017.

At the AIR Awards of 2014, the song won Best Independent Dance/Electronica or Club Single.

Remixes
A remix single was released on 4 April 2014.
 "High" (Funkin Matt remix) – 4:22
 "High" (Terace remix) – 5:11
 "High" (Jealous Much? remix) – 4:14
 "High" (CRNKN remix) – 4:50

Charts

Weekly charts

Year-end charts

Certifications

References

2014 singles
2014 songs
Peking Duk songs
ARIA Award-winning songs
Nicole Millar songs
Songs written by Nicole Millar
Songs written by Sam Littlemore